Melanie Elie Ghanime (born 15 May 2000) is a Lebanese footballer who plays as a striker for Lebanese club EFP.

International career 
Ghanime made her international debut for Lebanon on 8 April 2021, coming on as a substitute in a friendly game against Armenia.

Honours
Individual
 Lebanese Women's Football League top goalscorer: 2019–20

See also
 List of Lebanon women's international footballers

References

External links
 
 
 

2000 births
Living people
People from Keserwan District
Lebanese women's footballers
Women's association football forwards
Eleven Football Pro players
Lebanese Women's Football League players
Lebanon women's youth international footballers
Lebanon women's international footballers